Secret Weapon or Secret Weapons may refer to:

Art, entertainment, and media

Comics
 Asterix and the Secret Weapon, a 1991 comic book

Film
 Sherlock Holmes and the Secret Weapon, a 1943 film starring Basil Rathbone
 Secret Weapon (film), a 1990 historical film

Literature
 Alex Rider: Secret Weapon, a 2003 short story and 2018 collection
 Las armas secretas, a 1959 short story collection by Julio Cortázar
 The Last of the Jedi: Secret Weapon, a 2007 book and the seventh in the Last of the Jedi series

Music
Groups
 Secret Weapon (group), an 80s R&B band
 Secret Weapons (band), a 2010s American musical band

Albums
 Secret Weapon (album), a 2007 MxPx album and its title track

Television
 "Secret Weapons", a second-season Danny Phantom episode

See also
 Secret Weapons of World War II (disambiguation)
 Concealed carry